Leanne Amber Rafol Bautista (born October 14, 2010) is a Filipina child actress. She is best known as Kat Kat from the 2016 Filipino television series Juan Happy Love Story.

Career
Bautista began her show business career in 2015 at the age of four when she appeared in a commercial for SkyBroadband. She made her acting debut as Kat Kat, the adopted daughter of Dennis Trillo and Heart Evangelista, in the 2016 television series Juan Happy Love Story.

Filmography

References

External links
 
 Leanne on GMA News Online

2010 births
Living people
21st-century Filipino actresses
GMA Network personalities
Filipino child actresses
Filipino television actresses
Filipino Roman Catholics
People from Tarlac
Tagalog people